Beto Cuevas is the former songwriter, lead singer, and sometimes guitarist of the Chilean band La Ley, before they broke up in 2005. He was born in Santiago, Chile, and now resides in Los Angeles, California. He released 8 studio albums with La Ley, including a greatest hits compilation and a live album.

Solo studio albums

Singles

Studio albums with La Ley

References

External links
 Beto Cuevas' official website

Rock music discographies
Discographies of American artists
Discographies of Chilean artists